Soumoulou is a commune in the French department of the Pyrénées-Atlantiques, region of Nouvelle-Aquitaine (before 2015: Aquitaine), southwestern France. It is 120 km from the Basque Coast and the beaches south of the Landes coast and 70 km from the Pyrenees.

References

See also
Communes of the Pyrénées-Atlantiques department

Communes of Pyrénées-Atlantiques
Pyrénées-Atlantiques communes articles needing translation from French Wikipedia